The First Battle of Cape Finisterre (14 May 1747) was waged during the War of the Austrian Succession. It refers to the attack by 14 British ships of the line under Admiral George Anson against a French 30-ship convoy commanded by Admiral de la Jonquière. The French were attempting to protect their merchant ships by using warships with them. The British captured 4 ships of the line, 2 frigates, and 7 merchantmen, in a five-hour battle in the Atlantic Ocean off Cape Finisterre in northwest Spain. One French frigate, one French East India Company warship, and the other merchantmen escaped.

Events

Prelude
France needed to keep shipping lanes open in order to maintain her overseas empire. To this end she assembled merchantmen into convoys protected by warships. When a large convoy was sighted, Anson made the signal to form line of battle. Rear-Admiral Warren, suspecting the enemy to be manoeuvring to promote the escape of the convoy, bore down and communicated his opinion to the admiral; the latter threw out a signal for a general chase.

Battle
 under a press of sail, was the first to come up to the rearmost French ship, which she attacked severely, and two other ships dropped astern to her support. The action became general when three more British ships, including Devonshire, came up. The French, though much inferior in numbers, fought till seven in the evening, when all but two of their ships were taken, as well as nine East India merchantmen. The French lost 700 men killed and wounded, and the British 520. Over £300,000 was found on board the ships of war, which were turned into British ships. 

François de Grasse, later the famous Comte, was wounded in this first battle. He was taken prisoner among the crew and officers on La Gloire, which was captured.

Aftermath
Following his victory, Anson was raised to the peerage. The French assembled another, much bigger, convoy which set sail in October. After Edward Hawke's defeat of this fleet in the Second Battle of Cape Finisterre, the French naval operations were ended for the rest of the war. 

According to American historian William Williamson's 1832 account, the battle was a 
"most severe blow to the French interests in America. Besides immense property taken, there were found on board … numerous articles designed for the Acadians and Indians".

Order of battle

Britain

France

See also
 2nd Battle of Cape Finisterre
 Battle of Cape Finisterre (1805)

Notes

References

External links

Conflicts in 1747
Naval battles of the War of the Austrian Succession
Naval battles involving Great Britain
Naval battles involving France
Battles in Galicia (Spain)
1747 in Europe